

International
 European route E99

Australia
 Springbrook Road, Queensland

Canada 
 British Columbia Highway 99
 Ontario Highway 99 (former)
 Saskatchewan Highway 99

China 
  G99 Expressway

India 
  National Highway 99 (India)

Iran 
  Road 99

Israel 
  Highway 99 (Israel)

New Zealand
  New Zealand State Highway 99

Poland 
   (former; 1986–2000)

United States 
  Interstate 99
  Interstate 99 (Delaware-North Carolina) (proposed) 
  U.S. Route 99 (former)
  U.S. Route 99T (former)
  Alabama State Route 99
  Arizona State Route 99
  Arkansas Highway 99 (former)
  California State Route 99
  Connecticut Route 99
  Florida State Road 99 (former)
  County Road 99 (Escambia County, Florida)
  County Road 99A (Escambia County, Florida)
  Georgia State Route 99
  Hawaii Route 99
  Idaho State Highway 99
  Illinois Route 99
  Iowa Highway 99 (former)
  County Road 99 (Des Moines County, Iowa)
  County Road 99 (Louisa County, Iowa)
  K-99 (Kansas highway)
  Kentucky Route 99
  Louisiana Highway 99
  Maine State Route 99
  Maryland Route 99
  Massachusetts Route 99
  M-99 (Michigan highway)
  Minnesota State Highway 99
  Missouri Route 99
 Missouri Route 99 (1929) (former)
  Nebraska Highway 99
  County Route 99 (Bergen County, New Jersey)
  New Mexico State Road 99 (former)
  New York State Route 99 (former)
  County Route 99 (Dutchess County, New York)
  County Route 99 (Herkimer County, New York)
  County Route 99 (Madison County, New York)
  County Route 99 (Montgomery County, New York)
  County Route 99 (Onondaga County, New York)
  County Route 99 (Orleans County, New York)
  County Route 99 (Saratoga County, New York)
  County Route 99 (Schenectady County, New York)
  County Route 99 (Steuben County, New York)
  County Route 99 (Suffolk County, New York)
  County Route 99 (Westchester County, New York)
  North Carolina Highway 99
  Ohio State Route 99
  Oklahoma State Highway 99
  Oklahoma State Highway 99A
  Oregon Route 99
  Pennsylvania Route 99
  Rhode Island Route 99
  South Carolina Highway 99
  Tennessee State Route 99
  Texas State Highway 99
  Texas State Highway Spur 99 (1940–1966) (former)
  Texas State Highway Spur 99 (1981–1984) (former)
  Farm to Market Road 99
  Utah State Route 99
  Virginia State Route 99
  Washington State Route 99
  Washington State Route 99T (former)
  West Virginia Route 99
  Wisconsin Highway 99 (former)

See also
List of highways numbered 99E
List of highways numbered 99W
A99
B99
E 99 road (United Arab Emirates)